The 2019–20 Winnipeg Jets season was the 21st season for the National Hockey League franchise that was established on June 25, 1997, and the ninth in Winnipeg, since the franchise relocated from Atlanta prior to the start of the 2011–12 NHL season.

The season was suspended by the league officials on March 12, 2020, after several other professional and collegiate sports organizations followed suit as a result of the ongoing COVID-19 pandemic. On May 26, the NHL regular season was officially declared over with the remaining games being cancelled. The Jets advanced to the playoffs and faced the Calgary Flames in the Qualifying Round, losing in a four-game series.

Regular season
The Jets lost their season opener 6–4 to the New York Rangers on October 3. The Jets struggled in the opening month of October, compiling a 6–7–0 record with 12 points out of a possible 26 to start the season.

Standings

Divisional standings

Western Conference

Tiebreaking procedures
 Fewer number of games played (only used during regular season).
 Greater number of regulation wins (denoted by RW).
 Greater number of wins in regulation and overtime (excluding shootout wins; denoted by ROW).
 Greater number of total wins (including shootouts).
 Greater number of points earned in head-to-head play; if teams played an uneven number of head-to-head games, the result of the first game on the home ice of the team with the extra home game is discarded.
 Greater goal differential (difference between goals for and goals against).
 Greater number of goals scored (denoted by GF).

Schedule and results

Pre-season
The pre-season schedule was published on June 13, 2019.

Regular season
The regular season schedule was published on June 25, 2019.

Playoffs 

The Jets faced the Calgary Flames in the qualifying round, losing in four games.

Player statistics

Skaters

Goaltenders

†Denotes player spent time with another team before joining the Jets. Stats reflect time with the Jets only.
‡Denotes player was traded mid-season. Stats reflect time with the Jets only.
Bold/italics denotes franchise record.

References

Winnipeg Jets seasons
Winnipeg Jets
Jets